Ann M. Kring is an American psychologist who is a professor at the University of California, Berkeley. Her research considers schizophrenia and mental illness. She was elected Fellow of the American Association for the Advancement of Science in 2022.

Early life and education
Kring was an undergraduate student at Ball State University in Indiana, where she studied psychology. She moved to the Stony Brook University for graduate research, focusing on clinical psychology. Kring considered the relationship between emotional expression and autonomic arousal in people with schizophrenia. Whilst completing her graduate studies she worked at the Bellevue Hospital.

Research and career 
In 1991, Kring was appointed an assistant professor at Vanderbilt University. She spent eight years at Vanderbilt, eventually becoming associate professor, before joining the University of California, Berkeley in 1999. Kring serves as Director of the Emotion & Social Interaction (ESI) Laboratory at the University of California, Berkeley. Her research considers how affective processes change in people with psychological disorders. In particular, Kring investigates how people with schizophrenia! had anhedonia. Anhedonia describes the diminished capacity of people to experience pleasure.

Kring is part of the Healthy Brains Project, a long-term study that looks to identify predictors of neural outcomes.

Awards and honors 
 1997 National Alliance for Research on Schizophrenia and Depression Young Investigator award
 2006 Distinguished Teaching Award
 2006 Joseph Zubin Memorial Fund Award
 2022 Elected Fellow of the American Association for the Advancement of Science

Selected publications

References 

Living people
Ball State University alumni
Stony Brook University alumni
University of California, Berkeley faculty
Schizophrenia researchers
American women psychologists
20th-century American scientists
21st-century American scientists
Fellows of the American Association for the Advancement of Science
Year of birth missing (living people)